Open central vowel may refer to: